Butters v Mncora is an important recent case in South African law, especially with respect to universal partnerships. An appeal against a decision in the Eastern Cape High Court, Port Elizabeth, by Chetty J, it was heard in the Supreme Court of Appeal by Brand JA, Heher JA, Cachalia JA, Mhlantla JA and Tshiqi JA on March 8, 2012. They delivered judgment on March 28, 2012. JJ Gauntlett SC (with RG Buchanan SC) appeared for the appellant, and A. Beyleveld SC (with NJ Mullins) for the respondent.

The court found that universal partnerships of all property which extend beyond commercial undertakings were part of Roman-Dutch law and still form part of South African law. Where the partnership enterprise extends beyond commercial undertakings, the contribution of both parties need not be confined to a profit-making entity.

The court held also that a universal partnership of all property does not require an express agreement. Like any other contract, it may also come into existence by tacit agreement: that is, by an agreement derived from the conduct of the parties.

The requirements for a universal partnership of all property, including universal partnerships between cohabitees, were found to be the same as those formulated by RJ Pothier, in A Treatise on the Law of Partnership, for partnerships in general.

Finally, where the conduct of the parties is capable of more than one inference, the test for when a tacit universal partnership may be held to exist is whether it is more probable than not that a tacit agreement had been reached.

See also 
 South African law of partnerships and trusts

References

Cases 
 Butters v Mncora 2012 (4) SA 1 (SCA).

Notes 

2012 in South African law
2012 in case law
South African partnerships and trusts case law
Supreme Court of Appeal of South Africa cases